The 2013–14 Bulgarian Cup is the 32nd official season of the Bulgarian annual football knockout tournament. The competition will begin on 18 September 2013 with the matches of the First Round and will ended with the final on 15 May 2014. Beroe Stara Zagora were the defending champions, but lost to the eventual champions Ludogorets Razgrad in the second round.

The winners of the competition qualified for the second qualifying round of the 2014–15 UEFA Europa League.

Participating clubs
The following teams competed in the cup:

Bracket

First round 
The draw will be conducted in September 2013. The first legs will be played on 18 September 2013, the second legs are on 23 October 2013. On this stage all of the participants start their participation i.e. the 14 teams from A PFG (first division), the 14 teams from the B PFG (second division) and the 4 winners from the regional amateur competitions.

Note: Roman numerals in brackets denote the league tier the clubs participate in during the 2013–14 season.

First legs

Second legs

Second round 
The draw was conducted on 16 October 2013. The first legs will be played on 6 November 2013, the second legs are on 27 November 2013. On this stage the participants will be the 16 winners from the second round.

Note: Roman numerals in brackets denote the league tier the clubs participate in during the 2013–14 season.

First legs

Second legs

Quarter-finals 
The draw was conducted on 26 November 2013. The first legs will be played on 12 March 2014, the second legs are on 19 March 2014. On this stage the participants will be the 8 winners from the third round.

Note: Roman numerals in brackets denote the league tier the clubs participated in during the 2013–14 season. Teams that are mentioned first will be playing at home in the first game and away in the second.

First legs

Second legs

Semi-finals 
The draw was conducted on 3 April 2014. The matches will be played on 16 and 23 April 2014. At this stage the participants will be the four winners from the quarter-finals.

Note: Roman numerals in brackets denote the league tier the clubs participated in during the 2013–14 season.

First legs

Second legs

Final

See also
 2013–14 A Group
 2013–14 B Group
 2013–14 V AFG

References

Bulgarian Cup seasons
Bulgarian Cup
Cup